Abequose is a hexose and a 3,6-dideoxysugar. It is a constituent of the in O‐specific chains in lipopolysaccharides that occur in certain serotypes of Salmonella and Citrobacter bacteria.  It is the enantiomer of colitose.

References

External links

Hexoses
Deoxy sugars